This is a list of Honorary Fellows of St Hugh's College, Oxford.

Julia Annas
Dame Eileen Atkins
Betty Boothroyd, Baroness Boothroyd
Andrew Burrows
Nicolas Browne-Wilkinson, Baron Browne-Wilkinson
Kay Carberry
Sir Andrew Dilnot
Dame Elizabeth Forgan
Rebecca Front
Gillian Gehring
Dame Helen Ghosh
Jane Glover
Heather Hallett, Baroness Hallett
Anne Hudson
Dame Leonie Kramer
Aung San Suu Kyi
Sir Quo-Wei Lee
Andrew Li
Doreen Massey
Alec Monk
Alison Noble
Sir Keith O'Nions
Margie Orford
Sarah Outen
Richard Ovenden
Ursula Owen
Roger Parker
Rebecca Posner
Robert Ribeiro
Bridget Riley
Jane Roberts
Janet Rossant
Subra Suresh
June Tabor
Robert Tang
Lionel Tarassenko
Jo Valentine, Baroness Valentine
Sir David Verey
Ian Walmsley
Mary-Kay Wilmers

References

Fellows of St Hugh's College, Oxford
St Hugh's College
People associated with St Hugh's College, Oxford